Talaimannar Grama Niladhari Division is a Grama Niladhari Division of the Mannar Town Divisional Secretariat of Mannar District of Northern Province, Sri Lanka. It has Grama Niladhari Division Code MN/52.

Talaimannar is a surrounded by the Talaimannar South, Kaddukarankudiyiruppu, Talaimannar Pier East, Talaimannar North and Talaimannar Pier West Grama Niladhari Divisions.

Demographics

Ethnicity 
The Talaimannar Grama Niladhari Division has a Sri Lankan Tamil majority (83.7%) and a significant Sinhalese population (14.2%). In comparison, the Mannar Town Divisional Secretariat (which contains the Talaimannar Grama Niladhari Division) has a Sri Lankan Tamil majority (79.0%) and a significant Moor population (17.8%)

Religion 
The Talaimannar Grama Niladhari Division has a Hindu plurality (49.9%), a significant Roman Catholic population (28.1%) and a significant Buddhist population (14.3%). In comparison, the Mannar Town Divisional Secretariat (which contains the Talaimannar Grama Niladhari Division) has a Roman Catholic majority (54.8%), a significant Hindu population (20.4%) and a significant Muslim population (17.8%)

References 

Grama Niladhari Divisions of Mannar Town Divisional Secretariat